The Intermountain Collegiate Athletic Conference (ICAC) is a defunct U.S. junior college athletic conference for schools in the states of Colorado, Idaho, and Utah that existed from 1936 to 1984. The league was part of the National Junior College Athletic Association.

History

Founded in 1936, ICAC initially consisted of six schools. The founding members were:

 

Over the years a number of schools entered and exited the league. In 1938, Mesa College joined the league. In 1939, the league saw its largest membership when Carbon Junior College (later College of Eastern Utah) and Snow College joined. In the early 1940s, the league saw disruption due to the outbreak of World War II – Ricks and Albion were forced to leave prior to the 1941 season, while Weber and Westminster were forced to leave prior to the 1942 season. The entire league suspended operations from 1943 to 1945. In 1946, the league resumed operations with Albion and Weber also re-joining the league. Prior to 1948, Mesa left the league, while Westminster and Ricks rejoined, and a new member also joined – Boise Junior College (later Boise College).

Following this expansion, the league would see a gradual reduction in teams. 1950 would be the final season for SICE as the school closed in 1951. Westminster left the league after the 1954 season. Weber left following the 1961 season, while Southern Utah left the following year. In 1963, Mesa returned, but Eastern Utah decided to depart the league following that season. Boise left after the 1967 season, and Mesa left after the 1974 season. The league reached its final configuration in 1979 when Eastern Utah re-joined. In 1983, member schools were Eastern Utah, Dixie, Ricks, Snow, UTCP, and CNCC.

1984 would be the final season of league play for the ICAC. In 1985, the NJCAA realigned its regions in response to a large number of Oregon and Washington schools leaving the organization to form the Northwest Athletic Association of Community Colleges. NJCAA Region 18 was expanded to include schools in Utah, which resulted in all ICAC members being merged into the Scenic West Athletic Conference (Ricks had already been a member of the SWAC in non-football sports since 1968). For football, the league was merged with the Arizona Community College Conference to form the Western States Football League.

Former members

Membership timeline

Championships

Football champions

National Champions (football)
Boise Junior College won the NJCAA National Football Championship in 1958.

References

External links
Year by year results of ICAC football
ICAC football champions
ICAC football all-time records

NJCAA conferences